The Madonna dei Calcinari or Madonna dei Calcinai is a Roman Catholic church located in the town of Sefro, province of Macerata, region of Marche, Italy.

History
The stone church was built in the 15th century. Inside the church are votive frescoes: Saints on the counter-façade (1457), a Madonna and Child above entry portal (1502), and a St Matthew (1544). The church suffered damage from the 1997 earthquakes.

References

15th-century Roman Catholic church buildings in Italy
Sefro